The Fréchet distribution, also known as inverse Weibull distribution, is a special case of the generalized extreme value distribution.  It has the cumulative distribution function

where α > 0 is a shape parameter.  It can be generalised to include a location parameter m (the minimum) and a scale parameter s > 0 with the cumulative distribution function

Named for Maurice Fréchet who wrote a related paper in 1927, further work was done by Fisher and Tippett in 1928 and by Gumbel in 1958.

Characteristics
The single parameter Fréchet with parameter  has standardized moment

(with ) defined only for :

where  is the Gamma function.

In particular:
 For  the expectation is 
 For  the variance is 

The quantile  of order  can be expressed through the inverse of the distribution,
.
In particular the median is:

The mode of the distribution is 

Also the quantiles for the mean and mode are:

Applications

 In hydrology, the Fréchet distribution is applied to extreme events such as annually maximum one-day rainfalls and river discharges. The blue picture, made with CumFreq, illustrates an example of fitting the Fréchet distribution to ranked annually maximum one-day rainfalls in Oman showing also the 90% confidence belt based on the binomial distribution. The cumulative frequencies of the rainfall data are represented by plotting positions as part of the cumulative frequency analysis. 

However, in most hydrological applications, the distribution fitting is via the generalized extreme value distribution as this avoids imposing the assumption that the distribution does not have a lower bound (as required by the Frechet distribution). 

 In decline curve analysis, a declining pattern the time series data of oil or gas production rate over time for a well can be described by the Fréchet distribution. 

 One test to assess whether a multivariate distribution is asymptotically dependent or independent consists of transforming the data into standard Fréchet margins using the transformation  and then mapping from Cartesian to pseudo-polar coordinates . Values of  correspond to the extreme data for which at least one component is large while  approximately 1 or 0 corresponds to only one component being extreme.

Related distributions

If  (Uniform distribution (continuous)) then 
If  then 
If  and  then 
The cumulative distribution function of the Frechet distribution solves the maximum stability postulate equation
If  then its reciprocal is Weibull-distributed:

Properties
The Frechet distribution is a max stable distribution
The negative of a random variable having a Frechet distribution is a min stable distribution

See also
 Type-2 Gumbel distribution
 Fisher–Tippett–Gnedenko theorem

References

Further reading
 Kotz, S.; Nadarajah, S. (2000) Extreme value distributions: theory and applications, World Scientific.

External links
An application of a new extreme value distribution to air pollution data
Wave Analysis for Fatigue and Oceanography

Continuous distributions
Extreme value data
Location-scale family probability distributions